Harigarh is a village in Safidon tehsil of Jind district in the Indian state of Haryana. It forms a part of Hisar division.

The village is on the border of the Jind and Panipat districts. Safidon, Gohana, Assandh, and Jind are the nearby cities.

Nearby villages are: Ram Nagar (2 km), Bagru Kalan (2 km), Bagru Khurd (2 km), Anchra Khurd (2 km), Hadwa (5 km) are the nearby villages to Harigarh. Harigarh is surrounded by Pillu khera Tehsil towards west, Mundlana Tehsil towards east, Gohana Tehsil towards south .

Education
No any collages

Schools
National Sr. Secondary School, Bagru Kalan
Saraswati Sr. Secondary School, Bagru Kalan
Vedic Kanya Gurukul Sr. Secondary School
B.R.S.K. Public School
MD Sr. Secondary School, Baghru Khurd

Transportation
Sila Kheri Halt Rail Way Station, Budhakhera Railway Station are the closest railway stations to Harigarh. Panipat Junction is the nearest major railway station,  distant.

References 

Villages in Jind district